The 1996 IAAF World Cross Country Championships was held in Stellenbosch, South Africa, at the Danie Craven Stadium on March 23, 1996.  A preview on the event was given in the Herald, and a report in The New York Times.

Complete results for senior men, junior men, senior women, junior women, medallists, 
 and the results of British athletes were published.

Medallists

Race results

Senior men's race (12.15 km)

Note: Athletes in parentheses did not score for the team result

Junior men's race (8.35 km)

Note: Athletes in parentheses did not score for the team result

Senior women's race (6.3 km)

Note: Athletes in parentheses did not score for the team result

Junior women's race (4.22 km)

Note: Athletes in parentheses did not score for the team result

Medal table (unofficial)

Note: Totals include both individual and team medals, with medals in the team competition counting as one medal.

Participation
An unofficial count yields the participation of 669 athletes from 65 countries.  This is in agreement with the official numbers as published.

 (6)
 (3)
 (8)
 (15)
 (7)
 (16)
 (10)
 (20)
 (4)
 (18)
 (7)
 (2)
 (10)
 (1)
 (3)
 (4)
 (2)
 (1)
 (27)
 (6)
 (16)
 (27)
 (2)
 (1)
 (2)
 (18)
 (14)
 (1)
 (27)
 (10)
 (22)
 (2)
 (26)
 (9)
 (1)
 (7)
 (12)
 (12)
 (17)
 (5)
 (11)
 (16)
 (12)
 (8)
 (1)
 (17)
 (13)
 (10)
 (1)
 (4)
 (2)
 (27)
 (27)
 (6)
 (1)
 (8)
 (2)
 (10)
 (7)
 (6)
 (26)
 (26)
 (5)
 (3)
 (19)

See also
 1996 IAAF World Cross Country Championships – Senior men's race
 1996 IAAF World Cross Country Championships – Junior men's race
 1996 IAAF World Cross Country Championships – Senior women's race
 1996 IAAF World Cross Country Championships – Junior women's race
 1996 in athletics (track and field)

References

External links
 The World Cross Country Championships 1996, Cape Town, South Africa - Results, website of the IAAF (Internet Archive)
The World Cross Country Championships 1973-2005 (Internet Archive)
GBRathletics

 
1996
C
C
1996 in African sport
International athletics competitions hosted by South Africa
Cross country running in South Africa
March 1996 sports events in Africa